Anwomaso is a town in Ghana. It is 15 kilometres from the centre of Kumasi. It is a dormitory town. It serves mainly as a residential area for workers in various companies in Kumasi. It served as a pilot study town for the Building and Road Research Institute of Ghana on termite infestation.

Boundaries
The town is bordered on the north by KNUST campus, to the West by Fumesua, to the east by Kentinkrono and to the South by Oduom.

References

Populated places in Kumasi Metropolitan Assembly